Club Deportivo Imperio Albolote is a football team based in Albolote. Founded in 1931, the team plays in Regional Preferente. 

The club's home ground is Estadio Municipal de Albolote.

Season to season

6 seasons in Tercera División

Notable players
 Manuel Lucena

External links
lapreferente.com profile

Football clubs in Andalusia
Association football clubs established in 1931
Divisiones Regionales de Fútbol clubs
1931 establishments in Spain